Matthew Thomson may refer to:
 Matthew Thomson (sport shooter)
 Matthew Thomson (tennis)
 Matthew Sydney Thomson, British dermatologist

See also
 Matthew Thompson (disambiguation)